Karkali Strict Nature Reserve (Karkalin luonnonpuisto) is a strict nature reserve located in the Uusimaa region of Finland. This small reserve protects a lush deciduous forest more commonly found in central Europe.

References 

Strict nature reserves of Finland
Geography of Uusimaa
Lohja